Hightown Hockey Club was a field hockey club based at Hightown, Merseyside.

The men's section of the hockey club was formed in 1914 and was part of the Hightown Club which ran several sports including cricket, rugby, tennis and football. The women's section was formed later and became one of the leading clubs in England winning three league championships and four national cup wins.

The men's team disbanded following the 1980s merger with the Northern Hockey Club and in 2004 the women's team merged with Bowdon Hockey Club which ended the hockey association with the village of Hightown.

Major National Honours
National Champions
 1995-96 Women's League Champions
 1999-2000 Women's League Champions
 2003-04 Women's League Champions

National Cup Winners
 1991-92 Women's National Cup Winners
 1994–95 Women's National Cup Winners
 1996-97 Women's National Cup Winners
 2003–04 Women's National Cup Winners

Internationals past and present
J E C Foulkes - Wales
Maggie Souyave - England & Great Britain
Colin Whalley - England & Great Britain

References

Defunct field hockey clubs in England
Field hockey clubs established in 1914
Field hockey clubs disestablished in 2004
1914 establishments in England
2004 disestablishments in England